Jevenstedt is an Amt ("collective municipality") in the district of Rendsburg-Eckernförde, in Schleswig-Holstein, Germany. The seat of the Amt is in Jevenstedt.

The Amt Jevenstedt consists of the following municipalities:

Brinjahe
Embühren 
Haale 
Hamweddel 
Hörsten 
Jevenstedt
Luhnstedt 
Schülp bei Rendsburg 
Stafstedt 
Westerrönfeld

References

Ämter in Schleswig-Holstein